Banqiao Station is a station of Line 7 on the Guangzhou Metro, formerly known as Nancun Station during its planning stages. The station is situated near Agile Beiyuan, located in Panyu District, Guangzhou. It began operations on 28 December 2016.

Station layout

Exits
Banqiao station currently has three exits.

History
On June 18, 2013, the station began its construction. In July 2014, this station was formally renamed as Banqian Station. The main structure of the station was completed on January 18, 2015, and it began operations on 28 December 2016.

References

Railway stations in China opened in 2016
Guangzhou Metro stations in Panyu District